Adokiye Amiesimaka (born 24 November 1956) is a  Nigerian footballer, who as a law student at the University of Lagos played for the  Enugu Rangers Football Club (of Enugu),  Sharks Football Club (of Port Harcourt),  African Continental Bank Football Club, Lagos, and the Nigeria national football team. Playing as a winger on the left of midfield, Adokiye’s pace and dribbling runs were a distinguishing feature of his footballing career.

Adokiye was a member of the Nigerian side that won gold at the  African Cup of Nations in 1980 and played at the soccer finals of the 1980 Summer Olympics. He also represented Nigeria at the 1978 and 1982 FIFA World Cup Qualifiers.

Adokiye attended CMS Grammar School, Lagos, where as captain of the school’s soccer team he won  Lagos State’s Principals’ Cup in a much-talked about final that featured St. Finbarr’s College (Lagos). He went on to read law at the University of Lagos,

A former Chairman of  Sharks Football Club (of Port Harcourt), Adokiye has the stadium in Ikwerre Local Government Area of Rivers State named after him. He is also a former Attorney-General and Commissioner of Justice in Rivers State, having served previously as Director of Public Prosecution in the state.

The 2009 Age-grade Controversy 

In 2009, Adokiye, a columnist with The Punch newspaper (a Nigerian daily) was embroiled in controversy following his claim in his weekly column that some members of the Nigerian Under-17 football team were a lot older than their "official ages". The  football authorities in Nigeria did not, however, follow up on this claim.

References

Africa Cup of Nations-winning players
Nigerian footballers
Rivers State Commissioners of Justice
1980 African Cup of Nations players
Footballers at the 1980 Summer Olympics
Olympic footballers of Nigeria
African Games silver medalists for Nigeria
African Games medalists in football
Sharks F.C. players
Nigeria international footballers
Attorneys General of Rivers State
CMS Grammar School, Lagos alumni
University of Lagos alumni
Living people
1956 births
ACB Lagos F.C. players
Association football midfielders
Competitors at the 1978 All-Africa Games